U111 or U-111 may refer to:

 German submarine U-111, one of several U-boats with the number 111
 Utah State Route 111, a highway that straddles the western portion of the Salt Lake City metropolitan area